

Films

LGBT
1990 in LGBT history
1990